The Cleveland Daily Banner is a three day weekly newspaper published in Cleveland, Tennessee. Founded in 1854, it is the longest-running newspaper in Bradley County, and one of the oldest newspapers in the state.

The newspaper was founded as the Cleveland Banner, a Democratic newspaper by editor Robert McNelley (pronounced "McAnnelley"), and published its first edition on May 1, 1854. McNelley, who was a supporter of the Confederacy during the Civil War, was arrested by Federal troops in the fall of 1863, and the newspaper ceased publication. The newspaper returned on September 16, 1865 under McNelley's leadership.

Initially headquartered downtown, it moved to new offices on 25th Street in January 1970. On February 13, 2023, the Banner offices moved once again to 2075 N. Ocoee Street following the sale of the Banner to Paxton Media Group. Printing of the Banner moved to a separate site in Sevierville, Tennessee.

The two former associate editors, Rick Norton and Gwen Swiger, were with the newspaper for a combined period of more than 50 years. The Gwen Swiger/Rick Norton Scholarship for Journalism and Communications, designed for students in Bradley County Schools and Cleveland City Schools, was announced on May 10, 2018 on a day designed in their honor by County Mayor D. Gary Davis and Cleveland Mayor Tom Rowland. The scholarship is being administered by the Community Foundation of Cleveland/Bradley County, and was established by Banner staff writer Brian Graves.

References

External links 
Official website

Newspapers published in Tennessee
Cleveland, Tennessee
Publications established in 1854
Daily newspapers published in the United States
Cleveland metropolitan area, Tennessee
1854 establishments in Tennessee
Mass media in Bradley County, Tennessee